Violet Astor, Baroness Astor of Hever DStJ (née Elliot-Murray-Kynynmound, styled Lady Charles Fitzmaurice between 1909 and 1914 and Lady Charles Mercer Nairne between 1914 and 1918; 28 May 1889 – 3 January 1965), was an English aristocrat.

Origins
Violet Elliot-Murray-Kynynmound was born on 28 May 1889, the third of the five children of Gilbert Elliot-Murray-Kynynmound, 4th Earl of Minto, Viceroy and Governor-General of India and Governor General of Canada, by his wife Mary Caroline Grey, a daughter of 
General Charles Grey, the second son of Charles Grey, 2nd Earl Grey.

Marriages and children
She married twice:
Firstly, on 20 January 1909, to Lord Charles Fitzmaurice (later Mercer Nairne; killed in action on 30 October 1914 in World War I) the younger son of Henry Petty-FitzMaurice, 5th Marquess of Lansdowne by his wife Lady Maud Evelyn Hamilton, a daughter of James Hamilton, 1st Duke of Abercorn by his wife Lady Louisa Jane Russell, a daughter of John Russell, 6th Duke of Bedford. By her first husband she had issue one son and one daughter:
George Petty-Fitzmaurice, 8th Marquess of Lansdowne (1912–1997), who married four times and was the father of Charles Petty-Fitzmaurice, 9th Marquess of Lansdowne.
Mary Margaret Elizabeth Mercer Nairne (1910–2003)
Secondly, on 28 August 1916, she married John Jacob Astor, 1st Baron Astor of Hever (1886–1971), of Hever Castle in Kent and of Carlton House Terrace in Westminster, the youngest son of William Waldorf Astor, 1st Viscount Astor. He supported Neville Chamberlain and was elevated to the Peerage on 21 January 1956 as Baron Astor "of Hever". She moved with her husband to France in 1962. By Astor she had three sons:
Gavin Astor, 2nd Baron Astor of Hever (1918–1984), eldest son and heir of his father, who married Lady Irene Haig, the youngest daughter of Douglas Haig, 1st Earl Haig, by whom he had five children including John Jacob Astor VIII ("Johnny" Astor)
Lt. Col. Hon. Hugh Waldorf Astor (1920–1999), who married Emily Lucy Kinloch, a niece of Diana Vreeland, and had five children.
Hon. John Astor (1923–1987), who married Diana Kathleen Drummond, a grand-niece of Herbert Samuel Holt, and had three children.

Death
She died on 3 January 1965 at her villa in Pégomas, near Grasse in the South of France.

References

External links
Violet Mary (née Elliot-Murray-Kynynmound), Lady Astor of Hever

1889 births
1965 deaths
Violet
English socialites
Dames of Grace of the Order of St John
Daughters of British earls
Livingston family
English people of Scottish descent
Petty-Fitzmaurice family
Astor of Hever
People from Hever, Kent